Yasmin Finney (born 30 August 2003) is an English actress. She is known for her role as Elle Argent in the Netflix series Heartstopper (2022), for which she was nominated for a Children's and Family Emmy Award for Outstanding Supporting Performance. She is set to join the cast of Doctor Who in 2023.

Early life
Finney was born on 30 August 2003, to a Jamaican mother and an English father of Irish and Italian descent. She and her half-sister were raised in Manchester by her single mother. She participated in a number of local theatre productions while growing up, including in the University of Manchester's Sackville Theatre, the Royal Exchange Theatre, and the Aylesbury Waterside Theatre. She studied performing arts at college. Before her acting breakthrough, she initially gained a following through her TikTok videos about her experiences as a Black British teenage trans woman.

Career
At the age of 17 in April 2021, Finney was cast as Kelsa in the Billy Porter film Anything's Possible and Elle Argent in the Netflix series Heartstopper, the latter of which premiered in 2022. She had to pull out of Anything's Possible due to COVID-19 travel restrictions impacting her ability to get a United States work visa, leading her to be replaced by Eva Reign. She appeared on GLAAD's second annual 20 Under 20 list. 

On 16 May 2022, it was announced that Finney would join the cast of Doctor Who as a character called Rose for the 60th anniversary in 2023. Like Finney, Rose is set to be transgender. In August 2022, it was announced that Finney would star in the upcoming short film Mars as the character Charlie Acaster. The film premiered in October of the same year at the London Film Festival.

Filmography

Film

Television

Theatre

Accolades

References

External links
 
 
 

2003 births
21st-century English actresses
21st-century LGBT people
Actresses from Manchester
Black British actresses
British TikTokers
English child actresses
English people of Irish descent
English people of Italian descent
English people of Jamaican descent
Living people
LGBT Black British people
English LGBT entertainers
LGBT TikTokers
Transgender actresses
Place of birth missing (living people)